Mitchell Bobrow is a former martial arts fighter who was trained by Ki Whang Kim in the early 1960s. Bobrow was known for his continuous attacks using a unique combinations of kicks, punches and sweeps including his Trademark Jump Back Kick that scored on his opponents with either leg.

Early life
Mitchell Bobrow was born in Washington, DC. Born to Meyer Bobrow, who immigrated from Poland, and Sara Bobrow of Baltimore, MD. He was the second of three boys, brothers Nathan Mark and Jack Hal Bobrow.
Mitchell began Karate/Taekwondo training at the age of 12 while attending Montgomery Hills Junior High School, Silver Springs, MD

Career
Bobrow was the first fighter to be nicknamed by Blackbelt magazine "Boy Wonder"  in 1967.  Bobrow started competing as a Black Belt at the young age of 15  with  Chuck Norris, Joe Lewis, Ron Marchini, Toyotaro Miyazaki, Benny Urquidez, Jim Harrison, Louis Delgato, Joe Hayes, Thomas La Puppet Carroll and Bill "Superfoot" Wallace during the blood and guts "golden era" of Martial Arts Combat in the US. Bobrow was a friend of Bruce Lee, who was often seen coaching when Bobrow competed on the sidelines.  Blackbelt magazine yearbook rated Bobrow as a top ten fighter in the world throughout the 60s, and Karate Illustrated magazine placed him #1 in 1969 above Chuck Norris, Joe Lewis, and Bill Wallace. Bobrow was the youngest fighter ever to be ranked a Top Ten fighter by Blackbelt Magazine and still holds that honor.

Bobrow was inducted into the inaugural Taekwondo Hall of Fame as Best Fighter of the 60s and was the event's chairman.  In 2009 he was selected as a Technical Advisor for the Taekwondo Hall of Fame.  He represented the United States Team in Tokyo at the First Karate World Championships, the World Karate Federation held at the Nippon Budokan. He was Grand Champion at 1969 All American Open Championship at Madison Square Garden, American Invitational Tournament of Champions, Marine Corps Grand Champion, International Heavyweight Champion and Universal Open Champion. Bobrow was the founder of the first chartered karate club in the United States at Bethesda Chevy Chase High School in 1966 and graduated from George Washington University and Baron Brown Acting Studio. Bobrow opened E F Sly- Superstar Boutique in the trendy Georgetown quarter of Washington DC in 1972. Bobrow is the founder-owner of Otomix Sports & Martial Arts Gear, which was the official sponsor of the first UFC mixed martial arts fighting championships in 1993. Bobrow produced the Black Belt Grand Slam of Karate with Arnold Schwarzenegger and PKA founder Joe Corley. Otomix is the first company to design and manufacture a sports-specific shoe for bodybuilders, weightlifters, and martial artists. Bobrow has appeared in films and television. In 2012, Bobrow founded the Ultimate Professional Golf Shootout, a professional golf event and tour in Las Vegas. Bobrow operates Otomix Sports Gear, is an Elected National Board Member of SAG-AFTRA 2021–25, and is a Real Estate Professional in Nevada.

Filmography

References

External links

 Taekwondo Hall of Fame®
Grand Master Mitchell Bobrow 

Living people
1950 births
American male karateka
American male taekwondo practitioners
American tang soo do practitioners
American jujutsuka